Maurice Charreire (3 November 1894 – 10 October 1978) was a French racing cyclist. He rode in the 1922 Tour de France.

References

1894 births
1978 deaths
French male cyclists
Place of birth missing